The Alexandra Theatre is a 357 seat auditorium in the British town of Bognor Regis showing a variety of entertainment from comedy to drama to pantomime. It is part of the Regis Centre, which offers a range of entertainment from dance, musicals, drama, music and family events.

Regis Arts Centre
In addition to the Alexandra Theatre, the venue also has a cafe, charity shop. and two studio spaces. The venue is operated by registered charity Arun Arts Ltd.

Construction
It was completed in 1980 by chief architect Roger Westman - along with Eric Pelling and Bill Reed.

References

External links

 Official Website

Theatres in West Sussex
Bognor Regis